William Broughton (1768–1821) was an English public servant and early settler in the Colony of New South Wales.

Life 

William Broughton was baptised in November 1768 at Chatham, Kent. He arrived in the Colony of New South Wales with the First Fleet, under the auspices of  Governor Arthur Phillip, as a servant to surgeon John White. He was employed under every subsequent administration, in the commissariat department of the territory and its dependencies. According to the obituary in the Sydney Gazette, in his various public duties "he afforded general satisfaction."

Death 
At Appin, on Sunday 22 July 1821, William Broughton, Esquire, acting assistant commissary general, and a magistrate for the territory, died after a painful illness. The funeral took place on Wednesday 25 July at St. Luke's Church, Liverpool, and was attended by Governor Lachlan Macquarie, and most of the civil and military officers, and prominent inhabitants of the Colony.

References

Further reading 

 Carty, Margaret (1987). William Broughton and the Kennedy Connection. [Melbourne]: M. Carty.
 Gillen, Mollie (1989). The Founders of Australia: A Biographical Dictionary of the First Fleet. Sydney: Library of Australian History.

External links 

 Colonial Secretary's papers 1822-1877, State Library of Queensland- includes digitised letters written by Broughton to the Colonial Secretary of New South Wales

1768 births
1821 deaths